Chit Thaw Thu Ta Yauk is a 1962 Burmese black-and-white drama film, directed by Min Shin Naung starring Win Oo, Khin Than Nu, Kyi Soe, Than Nwet and Gyan Sein. The film was premiered on June 1, 1962.

Cast
Win Oo
Khin Than Nu
Kyi Soe
Than Nwet
Gyan Sein

References

1962 films
1960s Burmese-language films
Burmese drama films
Films shot in Myanmar
1962 drama films